Perl Mongers is an international association of user groups for the Perl programming language, and
part of The Perl Foundation. It was created as a stand-alone organization in 1998 by brian d foy and others, who formed the first group, the New York Perl Mongers (NY.pm), in August 1997 at the First O'Reilly Perl Conference. It joined the Perl Foundation in 2000.

Member groups are conventionally referred to with a short-form name of their location followed by ".pm", which refers to the conventional filename extension for a Perl module. "Perl Mongers" is a backronym for that in which "mongers" refers to ironmongers. foy's original idea for the name of the first group was the Perl regular expression /New York Perl M((o|u)ngers|aniacs)*/,, but "Perl Mongers" overtook it.

At the Second O'Reilly Perl Conference in 1998, foy and others helped to create many new user groups by providing a means for people to connect with others in their area. Perl Mongers provided services including web hosting, mailing lists, and user group leader discussions.

By the end of 1998, groups had been formed internationally and included: in the United States, Atlanta, Blacksburg (Virginia), Boston, Champaign (Illinois), Chicago, Dayton (Ohio), Grand Rapids (Michigan), Los Angeles, Missouri, Minneapolis, Philadelphia, Pittsburgh, Rhode Island, San Francisco, Seattle, St. Louis, and Washington (District of Columbia); in Canada, Montreal and Vancouver in Canada; in Europe, Amsterdam, Lisbon, London, and Stockholm; and in Australia, Melbourne and Sydney.

 there are 233 Perl Mongers groups around the world.

Notes and references

External links
Perl Mongers website

User groups
Perl